The Jimmy Raye Youth Foundation was started by coach Jimmy Raye II with his late friend Ronald "Chase" Chalmers as a means of benefiting underprivileged children in the Cumberland County area of North Carolina.  Seven years ago, Raye and Chalmers joined their efforts to create the foundation which provides  college scholarships to local students, as well as registration fees for recreational sports.  Each year, a luncheon is held to raise funds for the foundation and allow the local community to meet current and former NFL stars.   At the conclusion of the luncheon, a free football clinic is held for the attending children and is directed by Raye as well as the attending past and present NFL players.  Raye is hoping that the foundation will soon be able to provide a full college scholarship in memory of his late friend Ronald Chalmers.  The criteria for selecting a scholar recipient is chosen by Chalmer's three children.  While the scholarship is intended to provide an opportunity for a young person to attend college, academic performance and integrity are highly important which is evident as the foundation tries to enhance the success of adolescents in the Fayetteville, NC community.

Mission 

The mission of the Jimmy Raye Youth Foundation is to provide educational opportunities to identified "at-risk" adolescents that will enhance their ability to successfully function in society and positively impact the social and physical environment in which we live.

Past Speakers/Events 

2003- Darrell Green was a cornerback for the Washington Redskins and is considered one of the greatest cornerbacks to ever play in the NFL.

2004- James Brown is one of the most respected and admired sports commentators in the country.

2005- Joe Theismann and Marcus Allen both attended the annual event in 2005.  Joe Theismann was a former quarterback for the Washington Redskins and has done work as an NFL football analyst for ESPN.  Marcus Allen was a former NFL running back who was inducted into the Pro Football Hall of Fame in 2003.

2006- Marcus Allen attended the event for the second consecutive year and Sean Salisbury was a new guest speaker.  Salisbury was a former NFL quarterback who now serves as an NFL analyst on Sportscenter and Sunday NFL Countdown.

2007- Phil Simms was the MVP of Super Bowl XXI and a 15-year NFL veteran.  He is a major analyst for the NFL on CBS.

2008- Jamie Dukes was a former NFL guard and center who became an analyst for NFL Total Access after his retirement.  He is also the host of Put Up Your Dukes.

2009- Tony Dungy was the first African-American coach to win a Super Bowl as he led the Indianapolis Colts in 2007.  Dungy joined Mike Ditka and Tom Flores as the only individuals to win the Super Bowl as both a player and head coach.  He is the author of 4 New York Times winning novels.  His most recent book was titled Uncommon: Finding Your Path to Significance.  Dungy has been involved in numerous charitable organizations including the Fellowship of Christian Athletes, Athletes in Action, Mentors for Life, Big Brothers Big Sisters, Boys & Girls Clubs, and the Prison Crusade Ministry.

In addition to the keynote speakers for each annual event, numerous past and present NFL players attend the luncheon and kids' football clinic.  Former attendees include Joe Horn, Eric Dickerson, Leon Washington, Jonathan Stewart, Wallace Wright, Joe Theismann, Ernest Byner, Darrell Green, Curtis Martin, Sean Salisbury, and Vonta Leach.  From 2003-2008, the event was held at E.E. Smith High School in Fayetteville, NC.  In 2009, the football clinic was held at Jack Britt High School.

Officers 

Executive President- Jimmy Raye II
President- Bill Commons
Executive Administrator- Cressie Thigpen
Administrative Assistant- Edwena F. Raye
Board of Directors- Robin Raye Alston, Tommy Marsh, Michael Kapland, Olen Geralds, Rex Harris, Melody Chalmers, Chris Harris
Advisory Board- Tyrone Willingham, Paula Quick Hall, Herman Edwards, Bobby Mitchell, Georgia Buchanon, Walt Douglas, Eric Dickerson, Marcus Allen

References 

Jimmy Raye Youth Foundation. (2009). Jimmy Raye Youth Foundation. Summary-Speakers. (1st ed). Fayetteville, NC: Harris.
Harris, J. (2009, February). Jimmy Raye Youth Foundation. Retrieved from http://www.jimmyrayeyouthfoundation.org/Jimmy_Raye_Youth_Foundation/Home.html

External links 

Cumberland County, North Carolina
Football clinics